Jason A. Scott (born February 11, 1970) is an American rower. He competed in the men's coxless four event at the 1996 Summer Olympics.

References

External links
 

1970 births
Living people
American male rowers
Olympic rowers of the United States
Rowers at the 1996 Summer Olympics
Rowers from Seattle
Pan American Games medalists in rowing
Pan American Games silver medalists for the United States
Rowers at the 1991 Pan American Games